Iqbal Muhammad is a boxer from Pakistan who won the gold medal in the light heavyweight category at the 1978 Asian Games in Bangkok.

References

Asian Games gold medalists for Pakistan
Living people
Asian Games medalists in boxing
Boxers at the 1978 Asian Games
Pakistani male boxers
Medalists at the 1978 Asian Games
Year of birth missing (living people)
Light-heavyweight boxers
20th-century Pakistani people